Gustavo Alarcón (born 4 February 1999) is a Chilean foil fencer. He won the silver medal in the men's foil event at the 2019 Pan American Games held in Lima, Peru. In the final, he lost against Gerek Meinhardt of the United States.

In 2018, he competed in the men's foil event at the Pan American Fencing Championships held in Havana, Cuba without winning a medal. He was eliminated in his first match by Maximilien van Haaster of Canada.

References

External links 
 

Living people
1999 births
Place of birth missing (living people)
Chilean male foil fencers
Pan American Games silver medalists for Chile
Pan American Games medalists in fencing
Fencers at the 2019 Pan American Games
Medalists at the 2019 Pan American Games
21st-century Chilean people